Kuzköy can refer to:

 Kuzköy, Dursunbey
 Kuzköy, İskilip